ADE is a chemotherapy regimen most often used as an induction or consolidation regimen in acute myelogenous leukemia, especially in poor-risk patients or those refractory to the standard first-line induction with standard "7+3" regimen or who are relapsed after the standard chemotherapy.

ADE regimen consists of three drugs:
 Ara-C (cytarabine)  - an antimetabolite;
 Daunorubicin - an anthracycline antibiotic that is able to intercalate DNA and thus disrupt the cell division cycle, preventing mitosis;
 Etoposide - a topoisomerase inhibitor.

Dosing regimen

References

Chemotherapy regimens used in acute myeloid leukemia